In 1848−49, Hippolyte Fizeau used a toothed wheel apparatus to perform an absolute measurement of the speed of light in air.

Subsequent experiments performed by Marie Alfred Cornu in 1872–76 improved the methodology and made a more accurate measurement.

Fizeau's determination of the speed of light  

In 1848–49, Hippolyte Fizeau determined the speed of light between an intense light source and a mirror 8,633 meters distant. The light source was interrupted by a rotating cogwheel with 720 notches that could be rotated at a variable speed several times a second. (Figure 1) Fizeau increased the rotation speed of the cogwheel until light passing through one notch of the cogwheel would be completely eclipsed by the adjacent tooth. At 12.6 rotations per second, the light was eclipsed. At twice this speed (25.2 rotations per second), it was again visible as it passed through the next notch. At 3 times the speed it was again eclipsed. Fizeau's value for the speed of light was about 5% too high. The correct value is 299,792,458 m/s. It was difficult for Fizeau to visually estimate the intensity minimum of the light being blocked by the adjacent teeth, Other sources of error include the measurement of the distance from the wheel to the mirror, and the measurement of the speed of rotation of the wheel. Fizeau's paper appeared in Comptes Rendus Hebdomadaires de scéances de l’Academie de Sciences (Paris, Vol. 29 [July–December 1849], pp. 90–92).

Cornu's refinement of the Fizeau experiment

At the behest of the Paris Observatory under Urbain Le Verrier, Marie Alfred Cornu repeated Fizeau's 1848 toothed wheel measurement in a series of experiments in 1872–76. The goal was to obtain a value for the speed of light accurate to one part in a thousand. Cornu's equipment allowed him to monitor high orders of extinction, up to the 21st order. Instead of estimating the intensity minimum of the light being blocked by the adjacent teeth, a relatively inaccurate procedure, Cornu made pairs of observations on either side of the intensity minima, averaging the values obtained with the wheel spun clockwise and counterclockwise. An electric circuit recorded the wheel rotations on a chronograph chart, which enabled precise rate comparisons against the observatory clock. A telegraph key arrangement allowed Cornu to mark the precise moments when he judged that extinction had been entered on this same chart or exited. His final experiment was run over a path nearly three times as long as that used by Fizeau, and yielded a figure of 300400 km/s that is 0.2% above of the modern value.

See also

Speed of light § Measurement
Fizeau's measurement of the speed of light in water
Foucault's measurements of the speed of light

References

External links

 Sur une experience relative a la vitesse de propagation de la lumière by H. Fizeau (1849)
 A modern Fizeau experiment for education and outreach purposes

Optical metrology
Physics experiments